Bucks may refer to:

Places
 Buckinghamshire, England, abbreviated Bucks
 Bucks, Alabama, United States, an unincorporated community
 Bucks, Illinois, United States, an unincorporated community
 Bucks, Michigan, an unincorporated community
 Bucks County, Pennsylvania, United States
 Bucks Township, Tuscarawas County, Ohio, United States

Sports teams
 Milwaukee Bucks, a team in the National Basketball Association
 Laredo Bucks, a team in the Central Hockey League
 Flint City Bucks, a soccer team playing in the USL Premier Development League
 Waterloo Bucks, a baseball team playing in the summer-collegiate Northwoods League
 Ohio State Buckeyes, the intercollegiate sports teams representing the Ohio State University
 Buckinghamshire County Cricket Club, in the domestic cricket structure of England and Wales

As a nickname
John Buckley (Glen Rovers hurler) (born 1958), Irish former hurler
Nathan Buckley (born 1972), former Australian rules football player, commentator and coach
The Young Bucks, American professional wrestling tag team

Other
 Buck's night, Australian term for bachelor party
 Buck's Club, London
 Buck's of Woodside, famed Silicon Valley restaurant
 Racist slang for a male Native American
 Colloquialism for dollars

See also
 Beta Upsilon Chi, a Christian fraternity that has adopted letters BYX, pronounced "bucks"
 Buck (disambiguation)
 Bucs (disambiguation)
 Bux (disambiguation)